Andrena mentzeliae is a species of mining bee in the family Andrenidae. It is found in North America.

References

Further reading

 
 

mentzeliae
Articles created by Qbugbot
Insects described in 1897